VG Airlines, later Delsey Airlines, (airline code IV, later assigned to Windjet) was an airline with its head office in Merksem, Antwerp, Belgium.

History
VG Airlines was founded in 2002 to operate flights from Belgium to North America in the wake of Sabena's bankruptcy.  The airline was rebranded as Delsey Airlines, (named after Delsey Suitcases) but it ceased operations in November 2002. The pencil dark and light grey aircraft livery design with the feathered Belgian flag on the tailfin of VG Airlines was created by Lila Design in the Netherlands as well as the Delsey Airlines aircraft paint concept.

Destinations
The airline operated flights from Brussels to Boston, Los Angeles, and New York-JFK in the United States.

Fleet

References

External links
Delsey Airlines (Archive)
VG Airlines (Archive)
Airlines Remembered
Uniforms
AirlinersNet Photos

Defunct airlines of Belgium
Airlines established in 2002
Airlines disestablished in 2002
2002 disestablishments in Belgium
Belgian companies established in 2002